This is the list of airports served only by MexicanaLink scheduled flights:
On August 28 all destinations were suspended until new notice.
Guatemala
Guatemala City - La Aurora International Airport
México
Baja California
Tijuana - General Abelardo L. Rodríguez International Airport
Baja California Sur
La Paz - Manuel Márquez de León International Airport
San José del Cabo - Los Cabos International Airport
Campeche
Campeche - Ing. Alberto Acuña Ongay International Airport
Ciudad del Carmen - Ciudad del Carmen International Airport
Chihuahua
Chihuahua - General Roberto Fierro Villalobos International Airport
Coahuila
Torreón/Gómez Palacio - Francisco Sarabia International Airport
Colima
Manzanillo - Playa de Oro International Airport
Distrito Federal
Mexico City - Mexico City International Airport Focus City
Durango
Durango - General Guadalupe Victoria International Airport
Guerrero
Acapulco - Juan N. Álvarez International Airport
Ixtapa/Zihuatanejo - Ixtapa-Zihuatanejo International Airport
Jalisco
Guadalajara - Guadalajara International Airport Hub
Puerto Vallarta - Puerto Vallarta International Airport
Nuevo León
Monterrey - Mariano Escobedo International Airport
Puebla
Puebla - Hermanos Serdan International Airport
Quintana Roo
Cancún - Cancún International Airport Hub
Sinaloa
Mazatlán - General Rafael Buelna International Airport
Los Mochis - Federal del Valle del Fuerte International Airport
Tabasco
Villahermosa - Carlos Rovirosa Pérez International Airport
Tamaulipas
Reynosa - General Lucio Blanco International Airport
Veracruz
Veracruz - General Heriberto Jara International Airport
Minatitlán - Minatitlán/Coatzacoalcos National Airport
Yucatán
Mérida - Manuel Crescencio Rejón International Airport
Zacatecas
Zacatecas - General Leobardo C. Ruiz International Airport

MexicanaLink